John Coventre (died c. 1430), of Devizes, Wiltshire, was an English politician.

He was a Member (MP) of the Parliament of England for Devizes in May 1413, 
1420, 1422, 1423, 1426 and 1427.

References

14th-century births
1430 deaths
English MPs May 1413
People from Devizes
English MPs 1420
English MPs 1422
English MPs 1423
English MPs 1426
English MPs 1427